LVCC may refer to:

 Las Vegas Convention Center
 Las Vegas Country Club
 Liverpool Victoria County Championship, the current name for the first-class cricket competition in England and Wales